This is an alphabetical list of songs written or co-written by the American songwriter Craig Wiseman.

Song (date), Writers – Artist

0-9
"1-800-Use to Be" – Lorrie Morgan (Dave Duncan)
"100 Miles" – Blake Shelton (Chris Stapleton)

A
"Ain't Skeered" – Kevin Denney (Anthony Smith)
"Ain't Back Yet" – Kenny Chesney (Chris Tompkins)
"All I Have to Offer You Is Love" – Dusty Springfield, Tanya Tucker
"All I See Is You" – Dusty Springfield (Clive Westlake)
"Amazing Grace" – Phil Vassar (Phil Vassar)
"American Child" – Phil Vassar (Phil Vassar)
"And the Crowd Goes Wild" – Mark Wills (Jeffrey Steele)
"Anywhere USA" – Jason Michael Carroll (Brad Crisler)

B
"A Baby Changes Everything" – Faith Hill (Tim Nichols)
"Back" – Neal McCoy (Ronnie Samoset)
"Bang Bang Bang" – Nitty Gritty Dirt Band (Al Anderson)
"Beautiful People" – Tim McGraw (Chris Lindsey)
"Been There, Done That" – Ricky Van Shelton (John Jarrard)
"Believe" – Brooks & Dunn (Ronnie Dunn)
"Believer" – Brooks & Dunn (Ronnie Dunn)
"Betty's Got a Bass Boat" – Pam Tillis (Bernie Nelson)
"Between the Country and the Blues" – Jesse Hunter (Carlysle Johnson, Jesse Hunter)
"A Bible and a Bus Ticket Home" – Collin Raye, Confederate Railroad
"Black and Whites" – Phil Vassar (Phil Vassar)
"Black Label, White Lies" – Confederate Railroad
"Bobbi with an I" – Phil Vassar (Phil Vassar)
"Boys 'Round Here" – Blake Shelton
"Bring the Harvest Home" – Chris Knight (Chris Knight)
"Bubba Hyde" – Diamond Rio (Gene Nelson)

C
"Calling Me" – Kenny Rogers with Don Henley (Annie Roboff)
"Change" – Sons of the Desert (Mark Selby)
"Chasin' You" – Morgan Wallen (Jamie Moore, Morgan Wallen)
"Comfort Me" – Tim McGraw (Don Poythress)
"Could Have Been Mine" – Crystal Bernard (Janie Lambert)
"Cowboy Cadillac" – Confederate Railroad (Danny M. Wells)
"The Cowboy in Me" – Tim McGraw (Jeffrey Steele, Al Anderson)

D
"Damn Right" – Terri Clark (Julian Gallagher)
"Dangerous Man" – Trace Adkins (Brad Crisler)
"A Day in the Life" – River Road (Gary Nicholson)
"Deja Blue" – Billy Ray Cyrus (Donny Lowery)
"Don't Love Make a Diamond Shine" – Tracy Byrd (Mike Dekle)
"Dream You" – Pirates of the Mississippi (Jerry Phillips)

E
"Easy" – Shane Yellowbird (Jess Leary)
"Elvis and Andy" – Confederate Railroad
"Empty Arms Hotel" – Johnny Rodriguez (Ronnie Samoset)
"Even the Jukebox Can't Forget" – Perfect Stranger (Trey Bruce)
"Everywhere" – Tim McGraw (Mike Reid)

F
"Fall" – Suzy Bogguss (Trey Bruce)
"Feels Like I'm Gettin' Into Something Good" – Chris LeDoux (Kent Blazy)
"Finding My Way Back Home" – Lee Ann Womack (Chris Stapleton)
"Forrest County Line" – 4 Runner (Al Anderson)

G
"Good Ole Days" – Phil Vassar (Phil Vassar)
"The Good Stuff" – Kenny Chesney (Jim Collins)
"The Greatest Love of 1998" – South 65 (Bob DiPiero, Tim Nichols)
"Green" – Blake Shelton (George Teren)

H
”Happy Hour” - Morgan Wallen (Corey Crowder, Michael Hardy)
"Hard on the Ticker" – Tim McGraw (Gary Loyd)
"Harder Cards" – Kenny Rogers (Mike Henderson)
"He's a Cowboy" – Mark Wills (Danny Couch, P. J. Smith)
"Heart Like a Hurricane" – Larry Stewart (Trey Bruce)
"Heartbreak Shoes" – Ronna Reeves (Dave Gibson)
"Hell Yeah" – Montgomery Gentry (Jeffrey Steele)
"Her" – Aaron Tippin (Jeffrey Steele)
"Hillbilly Deluxe" – Brooks & Dunn (Brad Crisler)
"Hit It" – Toby Keith (Toby Keith)
"Holdin'" – Diamond Rio (Kelly Garrett)
"Hole in My Heart" – Jason Sellers (Al Anderson)
"Home" – Tim McGraw (Tony Mullins)
"Honky Tonk World" – Chris LeDoux (Paul Nelson)
"How Do You Do What You Do So Well" – J. C. Jones (Benmont Tench)

I
"I Ain't Got You" – Marty Stuart (Trey Bruce)
"I Can't Believe (You Let Her Go)" – Ricochet (Stephony Smith)
"I Don't Want to Hang Out with Me" – Confederate Railroad (Chris Knight)
"I Know the Way by Broken Heart" – Ricky Van Shelton (Ronnie Samoset)
"I Love You Again" – John Anderson (John Anderson)
"I Miss Her Missing Me" – Davis Daniel (Ronnie Samoset)
"I Wasn't Ready for You" – Ricochet (Ronnie Samoset)
"I'd Love to Love You" – Chad Brock (Jim Collins)
"I'll Be Around" – Mark Wills (Tim Nichols)
"I'm Diggin' It" – Confederate Railroad (Bob DiPiero)
"I'm Goin' Back" – Trace Adkins (Catt Gravitt, Bobby Terry)
"I'm in Love with a Capital 'U'" – Joe Diffie (Paul Nelson)
"I'm Not the One" – Shelby Lynne (Kent Blazy)
"I've Fallen in Love (And I Can't Get Up)" – Charlie Floyd (Ronnie Samoset)
"If I Ain't Got You" – Trisha Yearwood (Trey Bruce)
"If the Good Die Young" – Tracy Lawrence (Paul Nelson)
"If This Is Love" – Deana Carter (Al Anderson)
"If Your Heart Can't Do the Talking" – Holly Dunn (Lynn Langham)
"In a Real Love" – Phil Vassar (Phil Vassar)
"Is That Askin' Too Much" – Diamond Rio (Donny Lowrey)
"It Ain't Easy Bein' Me" – Chris Knight (Chris Knight)
"It Goes Something Like This" – Keith Harling (Al Anderson, Bob DiPiero)
"It Was You" – Trace Adkins (Trey Bruce)
"It's a Long Way Back" – John Anderson (John Anderson)

J
"Jesus & Gravity" – Dolly Parton (Betsy Ulmer)
"Just Another Day in Paradise" – Phil Vassar (Phil Vassar)
"Just Be Your Tear" – Tim McGraw (Tony Mullins)

K
"Keep On Rockin'" – Confederate Railroad (Al Anderson)

L
"Last Good Time" – Flynnville Train (Neal Coty)
"The Last Thing on My Mind" – Patty Loveless (Al Anderson)
"Leavin' Reasons" – Matthews, Wright & King (Kent Robbins)
"Let Me Love You" – Lonestar (Dennis Matkosky)
"Let the Guitar Do the Talkin'" – John Anderson (Kelly Garrett)
"A Little Bit of America" – Daron Norwood
"A Little Bit of You" – Jason McCoy (Sonny Burgess, Jason McCoy)
"A Little Bit of You" – Lee Roy Parnell (Trey Bruce)
"Live Like You Were Dying" – Tim McGraw (Tim Nichols)
"Lonely Too Long" – Shenandoah (Al Anderson)
"Long Way Down" – James Otto (C. Michael Spriggs)
"Lost" – Aaron Tippin (Steve Seskin)
"Love Is a Beautiful Thing" – Phil Vassar (Jeffrey Steele)
"Love Me If You Can" – Toby Keith (Chris Wallin)
"Love Story in the Making" – Linda Davis (Al Anderson)
"Love Working on You" – John Michael Montgomery (Jim Collins)
"Love You Back" – Rhett Akins (Bob DiPiero)

M
"Mama Raised Me Right" – Charlie Floyd (Ronnie Samoset)
"The Man That I Am" – James Otto (Cory Mayo)
"A Matter of Time" – Jason Sellers
"Missing You" – Marcel (Marcel)
"Move Over Madonna" – Confederate Railroad (Troy Seals)
"My Hallelujah Song" – Julianne Hough (Steve McEwan)
"My Old Friend" – Tim McGraw (Steve McEwan)

N
"Never Say Never" – Ty England (Al Anderson)
"A Night in the Ground" – Trent Willmon
"No Love Songs" – Chris Cagle (George Teren)
"No More Looking over My Shoulder" – Travis Tritt (Michael Peterson)
"Nobody Gonna Tell Me What to Do" – Van Zant (Tony Mullins, Tim Nichols)
"Nothin' to Die For" – Tim McGraw (Lee Thomas Miller)
"Nothing Compares to Loving You" – Aaron Tippin (Jeffrey Steele)
"Nothing in Common but Love" – Twister Alley (Donny Lowery)
"Nowhere Than Somewhere" – Flynnville Train (Brent Rodgers)

O
"One Day" – Drew Davis Band (Jeffrey Steele)
"One Mississippi" – Jill King (Jess Leary)
"One Tonight" – Chris LeDoux (Al Anderson)
"The Only One" – Roy Orbison (Wesley Orbison)
"Ordinary Love" – Shane Minor (Bob DiPiero, Dan Truman)
"Ordinary People" – Clay Walker (Ed Hill)

P
"Party on the Patio" – Jolie & the Wanted (Jeffrey Steele)
"The Perfect Love" – The Oak Ridge Boys (Troy Seals, Joe Williams)
"Plan B" – Keith Anderson (Keith Anderson)
"Price to Pay" – Randy Travis (Trey Bruce)

Q

R
"Red Nekkid" – Flynnville Train (Tom Douglas)
"Redneck Romeo" – The Forester Sisters (Dave Gibson)
"Ride" – Trace Adkins (Peter Kvint)
"Rough & Ready" – Trace Adkins (Brian White, Blair Mackichan)

S
"She Does" – Chad Brock (Chris Farren)
"She Loved Me" – Jeffrey Steele (Jeffrey Steele)
"She Treats Her Body Like a Temple" – Confederate Railroad (Rivers Rutherford)
"She's Got It All" – Kenny Chesney (Drew Womack)
"Shotgun" – Dallas Smith (Rodney Clawson)
"Somebody Said a Prayer" – Billy Ray Cyrus (Neil Thrasher)
"Someone Else's Dream" – Faith Hill (Trey Bruce)
"Somethin' 'bout a Sunday" – Michael Peterson (Tim Nichols)
"Something's Gotta Give" – LeAnn Rimes (Trey Mullins)
"Sometimes" - Black Stone Cherry
"Sometimes You've Just Gotta Ride" – Chris LeDoux (Trey Bruce)
"Stepping Stone" – Lari White (David Kent, Lari White)
"Suite Natural Girl" – Jeffrey Steele (Kip Raines, Jeffrey Steele)
"Summertime" – Kenny Chesney (Steve McEwan)
"Sunday Morning and Saturday Night" – Confederate Railroad (Danny Shirley)
"Superman" – Keith Urban (Keith Urban, Ben Berger, Ryan Rabin, Ryan McMahon)
"Sweet Love" – Trisha Yearwood (Tia Sillers)
"Sweet Natural Girl" – Emerson Drive (Kip Raines, Jeffrey Steele)

T
”Talkin Tennessee” - Morgan Wallen (Jeff Hyde)
"Tell Her" – Lonestar (Kwesi B.)
"Tennessee Girl" – Sammy Kershaw (Bob DiPiero)
"Tequila Sheila" – Flynnville Train (Scotty Emerick)
"That Was Us" – Tracy Lawrence (Tony Lane)
"That's What It's All About" – Brooks & Dunn (Steve McEwan)
"That's What Loving You Means to Me" – Chris LeDoux (Al Anderson)
"This Is Your Brain" – Joe Diffie (Kelly Garrett)
"Thought It Was You" – Lonestar (Jim Collins)
"Train" – Van Zant (Tony Mullins, Donnie Van Zant, Johnny Van Zant)
"Try Getting over You" – Daron Norwood (Paul Nelson)
"Two Badly Broken Hearts" – Sonya Isaacs (Sonya Isaacs)

U

V
"Voices" – Chris Young (Chris Tompkins, Chris Young)

W
"Waitin' in the Country" – Jason Michael Carroll (Cole Deggs)
"Walkin' Away" – Diamond Rio (Annie Roboff)
"Wasted Revenge" – Steve Forde (Jeffrey Steele)
"Wasted Time" – Confederate Railroad (Danny Shirley)
"Water and Bridges" – Collin Raye (Tim Nichols)
"Way Back Texas" – Pat Green (Wendell Mobley)
"We Talked" – Carolyn Dawn Johnson (Carolyn Dawn Johnson)
"What I Want and What I Get" – Pirates of the Mississippi (Bill McCorvey, Troy Seals)
"What Makes a Man" – Michael Peterson (Michael Peterson, Maia Sharp)
"When I Come Back (I Wanna Be My Dog)" – Greg Holland (Al Anderson)
"When Love Looks Back at You" – Hal Ketchum (Jess Leary)
"When the Lights Go Down" – Faith Hill (Rivers Rutherford, Jeffrey Steele)
"When We Get There" – Carter's Chord (Sarah Buxton)
"When You Said You Loved Me" – Jeff Carson (Trey Bruce)
"Where Did I Go So Right" – Jeff Carson (Jim Collins)
"Where the Green Grass Grows" – Tim McGraw (Jess Leary)
"Which Five Years" – Pam Tillis (Lisa Drew)
"Who Invented the Wheel" – Trisha Yearwood (Anthony Smith, Bobby Terry)
"Wish for You" – Faith Hill (Darrell Brown)
"Without Your Love" – Aaron Tippin (Al Anderson)
"The Woman with You" – Kenny Chesney (David Frasier)

X

Y
"You" – Neal McCoy (Thom McHugh)
"You Ain't Doin' It Right" – Buddy Jewell (Tony Lane)
"You Can't Say I Didn't Love You" – Aaron Pritchett (Trey Bruce)
"You da Man" – Jameson Clark (Jameson Clark)
"You Don't Know My Love" – Ronnie Milsap (Jim Collins)
"You Owe Me" – Michelle Wright (Ronnie Samoset)
"You Take Me Home" – LeAnn Rimes (Dennis Matkosky, LeAnn Rimes)
"Young" – Kenny Chesney (Naoise Sheridan, Steve McEwan)

Z
"Zero" – Joe Diffie (Bob DiPiero)

Lists of songs by songwriters